List of hospitals in North Korea includes the following:
Ponghwa Clinic, Sinwŏn-dong, Potonggang-guyok, Pyongyang; opened in 1971
Pyongyang General Hospital, Pyongyang, scheduled to open in 2020
Pyongyang Maternity Hospital
 Pyongyang Red Cross Hospital(조선적십자병원)
 Pyongyang Medical College Hospital
 Pyongyang City Hospital One
 
Ryugyong General Ophthalmic Hospital (November 2016)
Okryu Children's Hospital (October 2013)
Ryugyong Dental Hospital (October 2013)
Koryo Medicine General Hospital (April 2001)

References

Hospitals in North Korea
Hospitals
North Korea
North Korea